The Brussels Bulls are a professional American football team based in Brussels, Belgium. The Bulls compete in the Flemish American Football League (FAFL) conference in the Belgian Football League (BFL).

History

2008 season

2009 season

2010 season

Regular season

EFAF Atlantic Cup
The Bulls were 3rd at the 2010 Atlantic Cup in Ireland.

2011 season

2011 Playoffs

2012 season

2012 Playoffs

2013 season

2013 Playoffs

2014 season

About the organisation
■ The Brussels Bulls American & Flag Football team was created in August 2005 by Lesley MOREELS (ex Brussels Saints, Brussels USR, Brussels Tigers), Jean-François WAIGNIER (experienced ASBL board member) and Stijn DE BACKER (ex Brussels Tigers, Brussels American School Brigands).
■ Organigram 
President : Stijn DE BACKER
Secretary : Nathalie DE COSTER
Treasury : Vincent DE COSTER
Board: Alain HUWART
■ From the beginning the Bulls have opted to develop a youth programme and to create on different levels youth teams, in order to support a strong Senior (19+) team.
■ The Brussels Bulls home field is based in Sint-Agatha-Berchem, Brussels, Belgium.

Statistics

Performance (2008-2011)
This is an overview of the performance of the Bulls against the teams in the BFL during the BFL regular and post seasons from 2008 until 2011 and the EFAF Atlantic Cup's from 2009 until 2011.

National titles
2009 Under-17 (Cadet)  Flag champion
2009 Under-19 (Junior) Tackle Champion
2010 Under-17 (Junior Flag) Flag Champion
2010 Under-19 (Junior) Tackle Champion
2011 Under-19 (Junior) tackle Champion
2012 Under-13 (PeeWee) Flag Champion
2012 Under-17 (Cadet)  Tackle Irisbowl Champion (Unofficial national champion 2012)
2012 Under-19 (Junior) tackle Champion

References

External links
Official Brussels Bulls website
Official BFL website
Official FFL website

American football teams in Belgium
Sint-Agatha-Berchem
2005 establishments in Belgium
American football teams established in 2005